Epicuticular wax is a waxy coating which covers the outer surface of the plant cuticle in land plants. It may form a whitish film or bloom on leaves, fruits and other plant organs. Chemically, it consists of hydrophobic organic compounds, mainly straight-chain aliphatic hydrocarbons with or without a variety of substituted functional groups. The main functions of the epicuticular wax are to decrease surface wetting and moisture loss. Other functions include reflection of ultraviolet light, assisting in the formation of an ultra-hydrophobic and self-cleaning surface and acting as an anti-climb surface.

Chemical composition
Common constituents of epicuticular wax are predominantly straight-chain aliphatic hydrocarbons that may be saturated or unsaturated and contain a variety of functional groups.

These waxes can be composed of a variety of compounds which differ between plant species. Paraffins occur in leaves of peas and cabbages. Leaves of carnauba palm and banana feature alkyl esters. The secondary alcohol 10-nonacosanol appears in most gymnosperms such as Ginkgo biloba and Sitka spruce as well as many of the Ranunculaceae, Papaveraceae and Rosaceae and some mosses. Other forms of secondary alcohols are found in Brassicaceae including Arabidopsis thaliana. Primary alcohols (most commonly octacosan-1-ol) occur in Eucalyptus, legumes, and most Poaceae grasses. Other grasses feature β-diketones, as do Eucalyptus, box Buxus and the Ericaceae. Young beech leaves, sugarcane culms and lemon fruit exhibit aldehydes. Triterpenes are the primary component in fruit waxes of apple, plum and grape. Cyclic constituents are often recorded in epicuticular waxes but are generally minor constituents. They may include phytosterols such as β-sitosterol and pentacyclic triterpenoids such as ursolic acid and oleanolic acid and their respective precursors, α-amyrin and β-amyrin.

Farina
Many species of the genus Primula and ferns such as Cheilanthes, Pityrogramma and Notholaena produce a mealy, whitish to pale yellow glandular secretion known as farina that is not an epicuticular wax, but consists largely of crystals of a different class of polyphenolic compounds known as flavonoids. Unlike epicuticular wax, farina is secreted by specialised glandular hairs, rather than by the cuticle of the entire epidermis.

Physical properties

They are soluble in organic solvents such as chloroform and hexane, making them accessible for chemical analysis, but in some species esterification of acids and alcohols into estolides or the polymerization of aldehydes may give rise to insoluble compounds. Solvent extracts of cuticle waxes contain both epicuticular and cuticular waxes, often contaminated with cell membrane lipids of underlying cells. Epicuticular wax can now also be isolated by mechanical methods that distinguish the epicuticular wax outside the plant cuticle from the cuticular wax embedded in the cuticle polymer. As a consequence, these two are now known to be chemically distinct, although the mechanism that segregates the molecular species into the two layers is unknown. Recent scanning electron microscopy (SEM), atomic force microscopy (AFM) and neutron reflectometry studies on reconstituted wax films have found wheat epicuticular waxes; made up of surface epicuticular crystals and an underlying, porous background film layer to undergo swelling when in contact with water, indicating the background film is permeable and susceptible to the transport of water.

Epicuticular wax can reflect UV light, such as the white, chalky, wax coating of Dudleya brittonii, which has the highest ultraviolet light (UV) reflectivity of any known naturally occurring biological substance.

The term 'glaucous' is used to refer to any foliage, such as that of the family Crassulaceae, which appears whitish because of the waxy covering. Coatings of epicuticular flavonoids may be referred to as 'farina', the plants themselves being described as 'farinose' or 'farinaceous'.

Epicuticular wax crystals
Epicuticular wax forms crystalline projections from the plant surface, which enhance their water repellency, create a self-cleaning property known as the lotus effect and reflect UV radiation. The shapes of the crystals are dependent on the wax compounds present in them. Asymmetrical secondary alcohols and β-diketones form hollow wax nanotubes, while primary alcohols and symmetrical secondary alcohols form flat plates Although these have been observed using the transmission electron microscope and scanning electron microscope the process of growth of the crystals had never been observed directly until Koch and coworkers studied growing wax crystals on leaves of snowdrop (Galanthus nivalis) and other species using the atomic force microscope. These studies show that the crystals grow by extension from their tips, raising interesting questions about the mechanism of transport of the molecules.

See also 
Wax
Plant cuticle
Glaucous

References

Bibliography 

Plant anatomy
Plant physiology